Śmierdnica is a part of the Szczecin City, Poland situated on the right bank of Oder river, east of the Szczecin Old Town, and south-east of Szczecin-Dąbie.

Neighbourhoods of Szczecin